A list of films produced by the Ollywood film industry and released in theaters in 2017.

References

Lists of 2017 films by country or language

Lists of Ollywood films by year